is a Japanese professional shogi player ranked 6-dan.

Early life and education
Itō was born in Hachiōji, Tokyo on January 4, 1982. He learned how to play shogi from his father when he was around five years old, and entered the Japan Shogi Association's apprentice school at the rank of 6-kyū under the guidance of shogi professional  in 1993.

Itō was promoted to the rank of apprentice professional 1-dan in 1998, and apprentice professional 3-dan in 2002. He obtained full professional status and the corresponding rank of 4-dan on April 1, 2007, after finishing in the 40th 3-dan League (October 2006March 2007) with a record of 13 wins and 5 losses. Although Itō finished league play in third place one win behind Masayuki Toyoshima and Kōta Kanai, his result was good enough to earn him a second promotion point and gave him the option to enter the professional ranks as a free class player, which he decided to do. Itō was the second player after Yūsuke Ina to obtain professional status under the promotion point system.

Itō is also an alumnus of Asia University, graduating from the university's Faculty of Business Management in 2004.

Promotion history
The promotion history for Itō is as follows:

 6-kyū: September 1993
 4-dan: April 1, 2007
 5-dan: October 25, 2013
 6-dan: May 13, 2021

References

External links
ShogiHub: Professional Player Info · Ito, Shingo

 YouTube: イトシンTV

Japanese shogi players
Living people
Professional shogi players
Professional shogi players from Tokyo Metropolis
1982 births
People from Hachiōji, Tokyo
Asia University (Japan) alumni
Shogi YouTubers
Japanese YouTubers